Statistics of the Scottish Professional Football League (SPFL) in season 2020–21.

Scottish Premiership

Scottish Championship

Scottish League One

Scottish League Two

Award winners

Yearly

Monthly

See also
2020–21 in Scottish football

References

 
Scottish Professional Football League seasons